The 1931 Isle of Man Tourist Trophy was again dominated by the battle between Rudge, Sunbeam and Norton motor-cycles.

The 1931 Junior TT Race was run at a very fast pace by Jimmie Simpson riding for Norton who completed the first lap in 30 minutes and 49 seconds and was 6 second ahead of fellow Norton teammate Stanley Woods in 2nd place and 18 seconds ahead of Freddie Hicks in 3rd place riding an AJS motor-cycle. Although, Jimmie Simpson was able to hold on to the lead for the next 5 lap, he was slowed by having to refuel every two laps because of carburetor problems. Further, carburetor problems causes Jimmie Simpson to drops off the leaderboard and eventually finishes in 8th place.

The 1931 Lightweight TT was dominated by the works Rudge motor-cycles and the race was lap 1 by Ernie Nott by 45 seconds from Rudge teammates, H. G. Tyrell Smith and Graham Walker in 3rd place. By lap 6, Ernie Nott had a lead of 4 minutes over the rest of the field, until on the last lap he slid of just below the Mountain Mile and finished in 4th place steadying a damaged push-rod with his hand.

The highly anticipated 1931 Senior TT Race which was again set to be dominated by Rudge and Norton motor-cycles. However, it proved to dominated again by Norton and Jimmie Simpson and Jimmie Guthrie, this time Guthrie led on lap 1 by 1 second from Jimmie Simpson and Norton teammate Stanley Woods by 17 seconds in 3rd place. Despite taking over the lead from Guthrie, Jimmie Simpson crashed on lap 4 at Ballaugh Bridge and the bike ending-up in the river. Fellow Norton teammate Stanley Woods finishes in 3rd place with a glove in the petrol-tank filler. The winner of the 1929 Junior Race, Freddie Hicks crashed on lap 5 at Union Mills and was killed.

Senior TT (500cc)

Junior TT (350cc)

Lightweight TT (250cc)

Notes
 During practice, Wal Handley slips off his F.N. motor-cycle at the Gooseneck.
 During the 1931 Junior TT Race, H. G. Tyrell Smith riding for Rudge retired on lap 3 running-out of petrol. At Ballacraine, Otto Steinfeller retired with gearbox failure. On lap 5, Ted Mellors riding a New Imperial motor-cycle and F.A.Renier both crash at Glen Helen. Both continue and Ted Mellors finishes in 10th place and Renier in 16th place.
 On the first lap of the 1931 Senior TT Race, Wal Handley riding for the Belgium motor-cycle firm of F.N. slips off at the Quarterbride and retires. At Keppel Gate on lap 3 of the 1931 Senior TT Race, R. F. Parkinson riding a NSU motor-cycle hits a bank and 3 spectators are slightly injured.

Sources

External links
 Detailed race results
 Isle of Man TT winners
 Mountain Course map

Isle of Man TT
1931
Isle